Ivanhoe railway station is located on the Hurstbridge line in Victoria, Australia. It serves the north-eastern Melbourne suburb of Ivanhoe, and opened on 8 May 1888.

History
Ivanhoe station opened on 8 May 1888, when a railway line between Collingwood and Heidelberg was provided. Like the suburb itself, the station was named after the novel Ivanhoe, written in 1820 by author Sir Walter Scott.

In 1949, the line between Ivanhoe and Heidelberg was duplicated. In 1951, duplication was provided to Alphington.

In 1960, boom barriers replaced interlocked gates at the Marshall Street level crossing, located nearby in the down direction of the station. The signal box for the level crossing was also abolished during that time. In 1979, the station received a minor upgrade.

On 21 June 1996, Ivanhoe was upgraded to a Premium Station.

Facilities, platforms and services
Ivanhoe has two side platforms. Platform 1 has a large red brick building, housing an enclosed waiting area, ticket facilities and toilets, while Platform 2 has a smaller red brick building. A footbridge is provided immediately west of the station buildings.

The station is served by Hurstbridge line trains.

Platform 1:
  all stations and limited express services to Flinders Street

Platform 2:
  all stations and limited express services to Macleod, Greensborough, Eltham and Hurstbridge

Transport links
Moreland Buslines operates one route to and from Ivanhoe station, under contract to Public Transport Victoria:
 : to Essendon station

Ventura Bus Lines operates two routes via Ivanhoe station, under contract to Public Transport Victoria:
 : Kew – La Trobe University Bundoora Campus
 : to Northland Shopping Centre

References

External links
 Melway map at street-directory.com.au

Premium Melbourne railway stations
Railway stations in Melbourne
Railway stations in Australia opened in 1888
Railway stations in the City of Banyule